The Minister for Forests was a ministry in New South Wales responsible for the management of forests for the purpose of the timber industry and was established in 1916 and abolished in 2019. While it was a separate portfolio for much of this period, it was generally held in conjunction with another portfolio, typically Lands or Agriculture.

History
Forests had been the responsibility of the Lands Department since 1897. In 1907 a Royal Commission was appointed to investigate the management and sustainability of forests for the purposes of the timber industry, comprising Alexander Kethel MLC, William Fehon/J  A Curtis, and William Freeman. The Royal Commission found that at the rate of consumption, commercial hardwood would be exhausted in 36 years and softwood within 20 years. Their recommendations included that the administration and control of forests should be given to 3 independent commissioners instead of the Department of Lands. This recommendation was only partially implemented, with the Forestry Act 1909, creating a Forestry Department that reported to the Minister for Agriculture. The department was abolished in 1916 and replaced with the Forestry Commission which reported directly to the newly created Minister for Forests, who concurrently held the portfolio of Minister for Lands.

In 2011 the portfolio was absorbed into Lands and Water. Since 2013 forests in NSW are managed by the Forestry Corporation of NSW, a state owned corporation.

List of Ministers for Forests

Notes

References

Forests